El Coral is a municipality in the southeastern portion of Chontales Department of Nicaragua.

Municipalities of the Chontales Department